Jorn Steinbach (born 20 January 1989) is a former Belgian professional basketball player.

Professional career
Steinbach made his debut in the Tweede Nationale (the Belgian second division) for Waregem. In March 2009 he signed a contract with professional club Okapi Aalstar for the rest of the season. Steinbach won the Belgian Cup in 2011–12, the season in which he had a breakthrough campaign. Steinbach averaged 10.3 points a game for Okapi and was named Belgian Player of the Year.

He signed a 2-year contract with Spirou Charleroi at the start of the 2012–13 season.

Steinbach retired at the age of 26 after several hip operations which ended his career.

Honours
Belgian League Most Promising Player of the Year: (2010)
Belgian Cup Champion (1): (2012)
Belgian Player of the Year (1): (2012)

References

1989 births
Living people
Belgian men's basketball players
Okapi Aalstar players
Point guards
Spirou Charleroi players
Sportspeople from Ghent